Fleming is a surname of Anglo-Saxon English origin, likely indicating an ultimate descent from a Flemish immigrant – though this might be so remote that no record of it remains other than the name.

Military 
Clas Fleming (admiral) (1592–1644), Swedish admiral
Henrik Fleming (1584–1650), Finnish-Swedish admiral
James P. Fleming (born 1943), United States Air Force pilot, Medal of Honor recipient
Jerzy Detloff Fleming (1699–1771), Saxon general and nobleman
Klaus Fleming (1535–1597), Swedish admiral
Lawrence J. Fleming (1922–2006) U.S. Air Force Major General
Richard E. Fleming (1917–1942), U.S. war hero
Valentine Fleming (1882–1917), Scottish politician and war hero

Music, art and literature 

Amaryllis Fleming (1925–1999), British musician
Andrew Fleming (born 1963), U.S. screenwriter and director
Anne Fleming (writer) (born 1964), Canadian writer
Atholl Fleming (1894–1972), British actor and radio personality
Berry Fleming (1899–1989), U.S. novelist
Crystal Marie Fleming (born 1981), American sociologist and author
David Fleming (writer) (1940–2010), English environmental writer
Don Fleming (musician) (born 1957), US musician and producer
Frank J. Fleming (active 2002-present), American columnist, author, and satirist
Ian Fleming (1908–1964), British writer and journalist
Jacky Fleming (born 1955), cartoonist
Justin Fleming (born 1953), Australian author and playwright
King Fleming (1922–2014), U.S. musician
Paul Fleming (poet) (1609–1640), Germany
Peter Fleming (writer) (1907–1971), British writer, elder brother of Ian
Renée Fleming (born 1959), American opera singer
Rosie Nangala Fleming (born 1928), Australian artist
Shirley Fleming (1929–2005), U.S. music critic and magazine editor
Tom Fleming (1927–2010), Scottish actor, director and poet
Tommy Fleming (b. 15 May 1971), Irish musician

Politics and law 
Amalia Fleming (1909–1986), Greek activist and parliamentarian
Chummy Fleming (1863–1950), Australian union leader
Claes Larsson Fleming (1592–1644), Swedish admiral
David Pinkerton Fleming (1877–1944), Scottish politician
Donald Fleming (1905–1986), Canadian parliamentarian
Elaine Fleming, U.S. politician
Erik R. Fleming (born 1965), U.S. politician
Francis Fleming (1842–1922), British colonial administrator
Francis P. Fleming (1841–1908), Florida politician
Henry Fleming (1871–1956), Northern Irish unionist politician
John Fleming (U.S. politician) (born 1951)
Kieran Fleming (1959–1984), Irish republican
Lethia Cousins Fleming (1876–1963), American suffragist, teacher, civil rights activist and politician. 
Louis-Constant Fleming (born 1946), San Martin politician, France
M. Brendan Fleming (1926–2016), U.S. politician
Malcolm Fleming, 3rd Lord Fleming (1494–1547), Lord Chamberlain of Scotland to James V of Scotland
Osbourne Fleming (born 1940), Anguilla politician
Peter E. Fleming Jr. (1929–2009), U.S. attorney
Pieter Kenyon Fleming-Voltelyn van der Byl (1923–1999), Rhodesian politician
Robben Wright Fleming (1916–2010), U.S. law professor and educator
Seymour Dorothy Fleming (5 October 1758 – 9 September 1818), British noblewoman
Valentine Fleming (1882–1917), British politician
Wilmot Fleming (1916-1978), American politician

Religion 
Sir George Fleming, 2nd Baronet (1667–1747), Bishop of Carlisle
Heinrich Fleming, Bishop of Warmia (1278–1300)
Michael Anthony Fleming (1792–1850), Irish-born Roman Catholic bishop in Newfoundland
Pete Fleming (1928–1956), U.S. missionary to Ecuador
Richard Fleming (bishop) (1385–1431), English minister
Thomas Fleming  (1593–1665)  Roman Catholic Archbishop of Dublin

Science and engineering 
Alexander Fleming (1881–1955), Scottish scientist, discoverer of penicillin
Arthur Percy Morris Fleming (1881–1960), English electrical engineer
Charles Fleming (ornithologist) (1916–1987)
D. F. Fleming, American historian
John Fleming (naturalist) (1785–1857), Scottish naturalist
John Adam Fleming, American physicist
John Ambrose Fleming, English physicist and engineer
Karen Fleming, American biophysicist
Sandford Fleming (1827–1915) Scottish born Canadian engineer
Wendy Fleming, New Zealand expert on Alzheimer's disease and dementia
Williamina Fleming (1857–1911), Scottish astronomer

Sport 
Bernard Fleming (born 1937), Scottish footballer
Charlie Fleming (1927–1997), Scottish footballer
Colin Fleming (born 1984), Scottish tennis player
Craig Fleming (born 1971), British footballer
Curtis Fleming (born 1968), Irish footballer
Damien Fleming (born 1970), Australian cricketer
Dave Fleming (baseball) (born 1969), American baseball player
Deborah Fleming (born 1991), English rugby sevens player
Derek Fleming (born 1973), Scottish footballer
Don Fleming (American football) (1937–1963)
Doug Fleming, Australian rugby league footballer
Flint Fleming (born 1965), American football player
Gary Fleming (born 1967), Northern Ireland footballer
Greg Fleming (born 1986), Scottish footballer
Haydn Fleming (born 1978), English footballer
Jessie Fleming (born 1998), Canadian footballer
Jimmy Fleming (footballer born 1901) (1901–1969), Scottish footballer
John Fleming (footballer, born 1890) (1890–1916), Scottish footballer
Josh Fleming (cricketer) (born 1989), English cricketer
Josh Fleming (baseball) (born 1996), American baseball player
Julian Fleming (born 2000), American football player
Marv Fleming (born 1942) American football player
Matthew Fleming (born 1964), British cricketer
Paul Fleming (boxer) (born 1988), Australian boxer
Peggy Fleming (born 1948), American figure skater
Peter Fleming (tennis) (born 1955), American tennis player
Reg Fleming (1936–2009), Canadian hockey player
Rikki Fleming (born 1946), Scottish footballer
Rudymar Fleming (born 1980), Venezuelan martial artist
Samuel Fleming (fl. 1910s), Scottish footballer for Hibernian and Clyde
Scott Flemming (born 1958), American basketball coach
Stephen Fleming (born 1973), New Zealand cricketer
Terry Fleming (born 1973), British footballer
Tommy Fleming (soccer) (1890–1965), Scottish-American soccer player
Valerie Fleming (born 1976), American bobsledder
Vern Fleming (born 1962), American basketball player
Wayne Fleming (1950–2013), Canadian ice hockey coach

Theatre and television 
Ann Marie Fleming (born 1962), Canadian filmmaker, writer, and visual artist
Art Fleming (1924–1995), U.S. television personality
Erin Fleming (1941–2003), Canadian actress
Jaqueline Fleming (born 1977), U.S. actress
Joy Fleming (1944–2017), German musician
Kate Fleming (1965–2006), U.S. audio-book narrator and producer
Lucy Fleming (born 1947), British actress
Mike Fleming, U.S. radio show host
Rhonda Fleming (1923–2020), U.S. actress
Thea Fleming (born 1942), Dutch film actress
Victor Fleming (1889–1949), U.S. film director

Other 
Arthur Fleming, namesake of Fleming House at the California Institute of Technology
David Fleming (disambiguation)
Donald Fleming (disambiguation)
Eric Fleming (disambiguation)
Harold Fleming (disambiguation)
James Fleming (disambiguation)
John Fleming (disambiguation)
Karl Fleming (1927–2012), American journalist 
Katherine Fleming (disambiguation)
Katherine Elizabeth Fleming, professor of history and administrator at New York University
Klas Fleming (disambiguation) (or Klas, Class, Claes or Klaus), numerous people
Marcus Fleming (1911–1976), British economist
Mary Fleming (f. 1550s), lady-in-waiting to Mary, Queen of Scots
Mary Jane McCaffree (née Fleming; 1911–2018), American political secretary and protocol author
Nancy Fleming (born 1942), 1961 Miss America
Robert Fleming (disambiguation)
Sean Fleming (disambiguation)
Thomas Fleming (disambiguation)
William Fleming (disambiguation)

Fictional characters
Bob Fleming, on The Fast Show
Lancelot Fleming, in the TV series Monarch of the Glen
Peter Fleming, Danish detective and collaborator with the Nazis in the novel Hornet Flight by Ken Follett
Henry Fleming, main character of Stephen Crane's novel The Red Badge of Courage
Aubrey Flemming, main character of the 2007 psychological thriller I Know Who Killed Me.
Ms. Pauline Fleming, a teacher in the 1988 teen film Heathers and it's 2014 musical adaptation

References

English-language surnames
Ethnonymic surnames